Telmanch Gainey (born December 25, 1960) is a former Major League Baseball outfielder who played for the Houston Astros from  to .

After his playing career in Asia, Gainey started giving baseball lessons at the Maplezone Sports Institute in Garnet Valley, Pennsylvania.

External links
, or Retrosheet
Ty Gainey at Pura Pelota (Venezuelan Professional Baseball League)
CPBL

1960 births
Living people
African-American baseball players
American expatriate baseball players in Japan
American expatriate baseball players in Mexico
American expatriate baseball players in Taiwan
Baseball coaches from South Carolina
Baseball players from South Carolina
Buffalo Bisons (minor league) players
Colorado Springs Sky Sox players
Columbus Astros players
Daytona Beach Astros players
Diablos Rojos del México players
Gulf Coast Astros players
Gulf Coast Pirates players
Houston Astros players
Koos Group Whales players
Leones de Yucatán players
Major League Baseball outfielders
Mexican League baseball players
Minor league baseball coaches
Navegantes del Magallanes players
American expatriate baseball players in Venezuela
Nippon Professional Baseball outfielders
Orix BlueWave players
People from Cheraw, South Carolina
Saraperos de Saltillo players
Tucson Toros players
21st-century African-American people
20th-century African-American sportspeople